The Shipwreck Treasure Museum (previously the Charlestown Shipwreck & Heritage Centre) located in the UNESCO World Heritage Site of Charlestown, Cornwall, England, is a historical museum housing over 8,000 artifacts from over 150 different shipwrecks.

In 2019 the historic network of tunnels beneath the museum (originally built to transport China Clay) were reopened to the public as 'Charlestown Underground'.

External links

Local museums in Cornwall
Maritime museums in England